The Japanese Right Army or Army of the Right was an army of unified Japan during the second wave of Japanese invasions of Korea, in the years 1597–1598.  It included forces from several divisions of the earlier invasions (1592–1596).  The Army of the Right consisted mainly of the former Second Division led by Katō Kiyomasa, the Third Division led by Kuroda Nagamasa and the Seventh Division led by Mōri Hidemoto, who replaced his cousin Mōri Terumoto.

Composition
Mōri Hidemoto (毛利秀元) – 30,000 men
Katō Kiyomasa (加藤清正) – 10,000 men
Nabeshima Naoshige (鍋島直茂) – 12,000 men
Kuroda Nagamasa (黒田長政) – 5,000 men

Battles Fought
The Battle of Koryong (Hangul : 고령)
The Siege of Hwangsoksan (Hangul : 황석산성)
The Battle of Jiksan (Hangul : 직산)
The First Siege of Ulsan (Hangul : 울산)
The Siege of Samga (Hangul : 삼가성)
The Second Siege of Ulsan (Hangul : 울산)

See also 
Japanese Left Army

References 

Japanese invasions of Korea (1592–1598)